The  is a kei car produced by Suzuki since 1979. The model, currently in its ninth generation, was first introduced in 1979 and has been built in many countries worldwide. The Alto originated as a commercial vehicle derivative of the Fronte, but over time the Alto nameplate gained in popularity and by 1988 it replaced the Fronte name completely. The Alto badge has often been used on different cars in Japan and in export markets, where it is considered a city car.

Nameplate history
In Japan, the Alto badge was originally meant to be for the commercial use version of the Fronte passenger car. The word "alto" is a musical term. When introduced, the Alto was only available as a three-door "light van" and with bare-bones equipment. However, Suzuki generally did not use the "Fronte" badge in export, usually calling all versions "Alto" abroad. Most early export Altos were thus technically speaking rebadged Suzuki Frontes. These were exported with changes such as enlarged engines, sometimes modified bodywork. Thus the Japanese SS40 Fronte became the SS80 Alto with a 660 cc engine abroad. The Alto badge gradually took over in Japan as well, as the distinction between kei commercial vehicles and passenger cars was diminished in early 1989. The Fronte line was retired in March 1989. The Alto plate has been used on export versions of various Indian-built derivatives since the early 1990s, as neither cars are restricted by the kei rules and Indian cars are also considerably cheaper than Japanese-built ones.

Thus, the European-market models were actually:
 1981–1984: SS40 Fronte with a  796 cc three-cylinder engine (SS80F/G).
 1984–1994: CA/CB91 Alto/Fronte (also referred to as SB308) with the same  F8B engine as the SS80.
 March 1994–2002: Maruti Zen (a wider version of the Suzuki Cervo Mode), with a 993 cc engine.
 2002–2009: Maruti Suzuki Alto (based on the HA12 Alto), with a 1061 cc four-cylinder engine. Sold until 2012 in other markets.
 2009–2014: Maruti Suzuki A-Star, with a 998 cc engine.

In 2014, the Suzuki Celerio replaced the Alto in Europe and many other export markets. Outside of the Japanese domestic market, the Alto badge remains used on the second generation of Indian-built Maruti Altos which is generally sold as a Suzuki in export markets.

First generation (1979)

The first generation (SS30V/40V), introduced in May 1979, is a three-door cargo version of the Fronte passenger car, equipped with a folding rear seat. Front suspension comprised coils struts, with leaf springs at the back. The steering was of the recirculating ball type, and four-wheel drums were used. On introduction, the Alto received the T5B two-stroke  (SS30) three-cylinder engine, producing  at 5500 rpm. The Alto was a "micro sensation" when introduced, largely due to its rock bottom price of ¥470,000 (circa $1,900 in 1979, at a time when the cheapest Ford Pinto cost $4,999 in the US). This low price was made possible by a number of Japanese special concessions for commercial vehicles: most notably, the engine was subject to less stringent emissions rules and did not require expensive twin catalysts. Two fewer doors provided another saving, as did the exemption from commodity tax. The Alto's success changed the kei-car market, and other producers such as Subaru (with the "Family Rex") quickly followed suit with cut-price "commercial" vehicles that were really intended for private use.

Suzuki was unable to keep up with demand the first few years, particularly in the home market. The Alto helped Suzuki move into seventh place in Japanese production for cars and trucks. In the last full year of production for this generation, it was still by far the best selling Kei car, with the Alto outselling the Fronte at a rate of about five to two.

In May 1980, a fully automatic two-speed option was added to the Alto SS30. In January 1981, the F5A four-stroke  from the Fronte was also made available for the Alto; although it only had a single-barrel carburettor, it too put out  but at 6,000 rpm.

In export markets, the Alto name was used for the passenger car versions (chassis codes with trailing letter "S") as well as on commercials (ending in "V"), while the van was marketed as the "Suzuki Hatch" in Australia. The four-doors were not proper hatchbacks, only featuring an opening rear window. Export cars were also available with twelve-inch wheels, unlike the domestic versions which only used ten-inch units until the introduction of the 4WD version in October 1983. The 4WD "Snow Liner" thus gained an extra  of ground clearance. Most export Altos were passenger car versions (which used the "Fronte" badge in the Japanese domestic markets), and usually received the  F8B engine and the SS80 chassis code. The 800 had better performance, and due to the higher possible gearing it saw an improved gas mileage as well - by about ten percent according to Suzuki. The SS80 was also built in New Zealand, by South Pacific Suzuki Assemblers at a rate of six per day. It was introduced in New Zealand in March 1980.

While Suzuki held on to the two-stroke engine concept for a half decade longer than any of its Japanese competitors, eventually market pressures and ever tightening emissions regulations spelled its end in the Alto by September 1981. The Jimny, however, did use the same  engine (called LJ50 in the Jimny) as late as 1987.

By 1984, the 800 cc Alto/Fronte (called "FX") were introduced in Pakistan and were locally manufactured by Pak Suzuki Motors along with the 1000 cc Jimny (SJ410).

Suzuki Hatch (Australia)
In Australia, the SS40V was sold as the Suzuki Hatch, only available as a two-seat commercial vehicle. This meant it was taxed at 35 percent duty as opposed to 57.5 percent for passenger cars, and sales were not affected by Australia's then-quota on import cars. The side rear windows were covered with fibreglass by default, with a glass panels optional. The only other option was air conditioning. The Hatch was by far the cheapest new car sold in Australia at the time, although equipment was limited: the buyer received standard vinyl seats and mats and cross ply tires, with the only concession to luxury being a push-button AM radio. M. W. Suzuki in Victoria, Suzuki's distributor for Southern Australia, introduced the "800 pack" in January 1981 that included the  motor. The pack also added steel-belt radial tyres, 12-inch wheels (up from 10-inch), front-wheel disc brakes and bolder bumpers front and rear.

Second generation (1984)

The second generation (CA71) was introduced in September 1984. This generation Alto echoed the design of the GM M-platform that underpinned the 1983 Suzuki Cultus. It continued with the F5A engine of the SS40, but also became available with turbocharged and multi-valve engines thereof, mainly in the "Works" series. In December 1984, a four-wheel-drive version (CC71) was added; until it arrived Suzuki had kept the four-wheel-drive version of the first generation Alto (SS41) on offer. The Alto Turbo gradually acquired more performance-related modifications until the Alto Works version was introduced in February 1987. It acquired considerable popularity, with models of it still made by Fujimi.

A five-door body became available on the Alto in October 1985. This was superficially identical to that of the Fronte's, but the rear seat folded flat and it was technically speaking a commercial vehicle. This was the first five-door commercial of its kind in Japan, and was originally a special model introduced to celebrate the one millionth Alto produced. The CB model code was not used on the Alto in Japan, as it signifies the passenger car version which was still sold as a Fronte in the home market.

In July 1986, the CA/CC71 received a rather thorough facelift. New wraparound headlights, a new dash and interior heralded the new available ITL rear suspension (Isolated Trailing Link), a three-link rigid setup. Some lower end models retained the earlier leaf sprung rigid axle; those with ITL received the CA/CC72 chassis code. A "Walkthrough Van" was introduced in January 1987, while at the other end of the spectrum, the personal coupé Cervo on the CA/CC72 base was introduced in 1988 with a new  F5B engine. In August 1987, higher spec Altos became available with a three-speed automatic rather than the two-speed unit that had been used before.

Other markets
Most export markets received the passenger car version, which would have been badged "Suzuki Fronte" in Japan, but were usually sold as Altos abroad. When equipped with the 543 cc F5A engine, the export model code is SB305. Most cars sold outside of Japan, however, received the larger (0.8 litres) F8B engine and the SB308 model code.

Europe
The 796 cc,  F8B-engined CA/CB91 was sold in Europe with either a four-speed manual or two-speed automatic transmission. Export Altos were technically speaking Frontes, as this was the name used for passenger versions in Japan. They received larger bumpers, making them  longer and  wider. European Altos received the same facelift as the CA/CB72 did in early 1987 (a little later than in Japan), followed by a market specific facelift in January 1988, unveiled at the Brussels Motor Show. This model remained in production (latterly by Maruti Udyog) for the European market until 1993, when it was replaced by an also Maruti-built 1-litre version of the Cervo Mode, which was sold as the Alto until 2002. The Maruti 800 did continue to be available under its own name in Europe until 2004, when it could no longer pass emissions and safety requirements.

India 

The Suzuki Alto was produced and sold in India as the Maruti 800 between 1983 and 2014.

Pakistan
While the car has been long retired in other markets, it remained in production in Pakistan under the moniker Suzuki Mehran. The Pakistani version  is essentially a simplified basic rebadged second-generation Suzuki Alto CA/CB91 which was sold in the Japanese and European market from 1984 to 1988. The Mehran remained in production due to its cost effective nature and cheap parts availability. In March 2019, the moniker Mehran officially ended its production after 40 years of production, replaced by the eighth-generation Alto.

China

Around 1990, the China Ordnance Industries Corporation (COIC, a predecessor company to Norinco) purchased the complete rights and all machinery for manufacturing the SB308 Alto from Suzuki. COIC charged four hitherto military enterprises with manufacturing the Alto: Chongqing Chang'an, Jilin Jiangbei, Xiangtan Jiangnan, and Xi'an Qinchuan were all to switch over to civilian manufacture. Chongqing Chang'an were able to adapt Suzuki's just-in-time manufacturing (JIT) methods and were the first to market the car, in 1992. Jilin Jiangbei lost money on each car built and ended up on the brink of bankruptcy; Xiangtan Jiangnan never got production off the ground, while Xi'an Qinchuan suffered a fire and chose to develop their own design instead (a car called the Qinchuan Flyer; the company was later made part of BYD Auto). Chang'an ended up without real competition in the segment. Chang'an's productivity set a new standard for the Chinese auto industry.

In 1993, Changan Automobile took over production of the Alto. The Changan Suzuki SC7080 Alto was produced with the same F8B engine as used in other export markets, and was replaced by the facelifted SC7081 Alto/City Baby/Little Prince/Happy Prince in 2001. The top-of-the-line Happy Prince, discontinued in 2007, used the sportier looking front bumper, grille, and bonnet of the Alto Works. Citing lower sales and stating that upgrading the design to meet new regulations would not be cost effective, Chang'an ended production of the old Alto on 28 July 2008. A total of 504,861 were built by Chang'an Suzuki between 1993 and 2008.

Another version called JN Auto has been built by Jiangnan Auto. As of December 2010 Zotye's Jiangnan Alto is one of the cheapest car in the world, with a price tag of $2830. The entry-level model comes with the  F8B three-cylinder . The Jiangnan TT was eventually replaced by the Zotye Z100 in 2010.

Third generation (1988)

The third generation (CL/CM11) replaced the CA71 in September 1988. This was the last generation of Alto to have an associated Fronte model. It had strikingly angular styling, with an unusual glazed C-pillar on the 5-door. Another curiosity of this generation was the availability of a version with a sliding door on the driver's side, the "Slide Slim", intended to simplify entering and exiting in tight spaces. It also made egress easier for the old and the infirm. The Slide Slim has two regular doors on the passenger (left) side. This door type wouldn't be used for some time until the arrival of the Toyota Porte and Peugeot 1007. When the Fronte name was discontinued in October 1989, the passenger car versions (CN/CP11) became Altos. Initially the CL11 used the 12-valve  F5B engine known from the SS71 Cervo, but with an added  6-valve version in lower-spec versions. A  DOHC version was also available in the Twin Cam Rl. Passenger car versions had the same engines, but all with 2 PS less due to more stringent emissions controls. The fuel-injected, 6-valve, turbocharged Works models came with an SOHC  engine (FF S/X or 4WD S/R) or a  DOHC version (FF RS/X or 4WD RS/R). The front-wheel-drive Works' were available with a 3-speed automatic in addition to the standard 5-speed manual.

This generation was very successful at home, with Suzuki's kei car sales tripling in 1989 versus the year before. It was, however, not generally exported, and was never built by Suzuki with engines of more than 660 cc nor with left-hand-drive. Export models arrived late, only by 1993 after the earlier export version had been retired, and it was only seen in a very few places, namely New Zealand, Hong Kong, and Singapore. In most countries the earlier Alto/Fronte was replaced by an Alto-badged Maruti Zen (an Indian-built Suzuki Cervo Mode). With a 0.8-liter engine the CL11 Alto was built with left-hand-drive in South Korea, Poland, Romania and Uzbekistan as the Daewoo Tico, and also in China by Anchi.

660cc era

The new standards also allowed for a  longer car, which meant new bigger front and rear bumper, and new headlights and grille. Lower grade Van versions received a 6-valve  engine, while passenger car versions (and the l'Èpo Van) got a single-cam 12-valve  version. Reflecting decreased tax benefits for commercial Kei cars, the Works series were now classified as passenger vehicles, allowing for a real back seat. The lineup was reorganised in January 1991, with a lot of new engine specifications.

In September 1991, responding to increasing safety demands, the Alto received side impact protection. Also, the vertical door handles (see picture on the right) on three-door versions were replaced by traditional horizontal ones. The re-engineering was extensive enough to necessitate new model codes, with vans becoming CL/CM22 (FF/4WD) and passenger versions (including the Works) now called CR/CS22.

This was the model that reached limited exports. The New Zealand version was mostly the same as the Japanese market five-door van model, with a cargo-oriented bare-bones trim combined with the rather soft Japanese suspension settings and light, low-geared steering. A three-speed automatic was also available.

A very limited production version for competition purposes arrived in 1992, called the Alto Works R. This was a lightened, strict two-seater with four-wheel-drive, a close-ratio five-speed transmission, and a tuned engine - although official output remained , as required by the Kei regulations. The car has an adjusted ECU and a free-flow Suzuki Sport RHB31 turbocharger, as well as a different throttle body. Less than a hundred were built, although it continued to be available until the arrival of the next generation Alto. This model, without a backseat and with racing bucket seats in front, was classified as a van and accordingly received the CM22V chassis code, unlike the usual Alto Works. The undercoating and most creature comforts were deleted (although air conditioning remained an option) and the car sat on steel wheels, which made the car about  lighter than a regular Works RS/R.

Alto Hustle

Suzuki also produced a version of the Alto, known as the Alto Hustle, with a raised roof behind the front seats. This was unusual in that it used a modification of the five-door Alto's body rather than a completely new body, allowing Suzuki to market it as part of the Alto family. Its appearance was similar to the Nissan AD Max van. The Hustle was short-lived, only being offered between November 1991 and October 1993.

The engine options were mostly as for other Altos, albeit without the turbocharged offerings. The standard model has , while a 12-valve version has  depending on if it was carburetted or fuel injected. The lowest and highest-powered versions were also available with four-wheel-drive, and there was a bare bones two-seater version (Hu-2) on offer.

Fourth generation (1994)

The fourth-generation Alto (HA11) appeared in November 1994. The design was marked by simplicity, as Suzuki strived to return to making a more basic car. The Slide Slim model, with its sliding door on one side, was discontinued, as were some of the higher end versions of the third generation Alto such as the Regina. The new Wagon R took over much of the more expensive Alto's market share, leaving the Alto to compete at the lower end of the market. The fourth generation was generally not exported, with most foreign markets instead receiving Alto-badged versions of the Indian-built Maruti Zen.

The  F6A engines were joined by a new high-performance   K6A (HA21) for the Works RS/Z model. Front-wheel drive or full-time four-wheel drive were offered, in three- or five-door sedans or as a three-door van. The Works model was also reclassified as a sedan, as many advantages for light commercial cars had vanished. The tailgate and rear doors are still fairly angular, but the front was more rounded than previous models.

Chronology
In March 1995, the Alto Sv model appeared. This was a special fuel economy model, well equipped with air conditioning, power steering, AM/FM cassette stereo, etc. The "Alto With", a limited sporty edition based on the well-equipped Sf model (also with four-wheel drive) with a front and rear spoiler, appeared in June 1995. In July 1995, a version of the Works Turbo ie/s called the Limited appeared; this had special stereo equipment and keyless entry and power locks. It was developed by AddZest (Clarion). In November 1995, the Works model received a new grille and front bumper, with a bigger opening. In May 1996, the l'Èpo model appeared, this three or five-door sedan was based on the Se/Le model and was also available with four-wheel drive. This version received full power equipment, remote key entry, distinctly upholstered full fabric seats (rather than the vinyl backed units of the Se/Le), hubcaps and many other amenities. All 12-valve models fitted with four-wheel drive and automatic transmission received a  fuel injected version, as was the case since the third generation Alto. The l'Èpo models also received a new (optional) airbag. The Works models only received smaller changes at this time, such as white-backed meters in the dashboard. The RS/Z also received 14-inch wheels and fuller equipment. In November 1997, the even better equipped l'Èpo Limited model appeared, with a more powerful stereo system including a CD player. In January 1998, the Works Sports Limited model appeared, a Works ie/s with 14-inch wheels and special seats. In May the "Alto Beam" special model appeared, with UV reflecting glass and extra large seats.

In March 1995, a second iteration of the Works R arrived, again a limited production vehicle with a close-ratio transmission, built for competition purposes. Like the first Works R it was built in less than one-hundred examples, but this one appeared in two series: The Series 2 had sold out by October 1995 and the third series was available from January until September 1998. Unlike the first Works R, this one was a passenger car version (chassis code HB21S) and received the new, lightweight K6A engine. It was lighter than the regular Works RS/R, and the engine was considerably more powerful - although claimed output remained  as per the regulations, torque increased from 10.5 to 11.0 kgm (at 3500 rpm for the Series 2, 4000 rpm for the Series 3). Period sources state that the engine's actual output was at least . The engine received considerable changes over the regular Works, many more than the first Works R. The throttle body and camshafts were different, while a larger HT06/RA12 turbocharger was fitted, along with 260 cc injectors and a larger intercooler (necessitating a hood scoop nearly as wide as the bonnet itself). The weight savings were only  over the Works RS/Z for this model. This was the end of the Works R series of cars, foreshadowing the end of the Works badge in 2000.

Fifth generation (1998)

The fifth-generation Alto (HA12/22) was introduced in October 1998. The styling was generally more rounded, the shape of the cabin showing the Alto's relationship with the new Suzuki Kei. Suzuki designed the new Alto with an eye to reducing cost, both for themselves and for the end users. To that end, weight was reduced to a minimum, while four-wheel drive models were able to use the same bottom plate as front-wheel drive models. With sales of the 2-seat commercial versions dropping steadily, those versions (Va and Sc, with four-speed manual transmission) were now only built to order.

The 658 cc K6A engine was now also available without a turbocharger, joining the turbocharged version and the familiar 657 cc F6A engines. The turbocharged Works models were available with a 60 PS F6A engine (Alto i.e., 5MT/3AT/4AT and FWD or AWD) or a 64 PS VVT K6A (RS/Z, 5MT/4AT and FWD or AWD). The front-wheel-drive RS/Z was sold with a non-VVT K6A engine when in combination with a 4-speed automatic transmission, it too with a claimed 64 PS. Unique to this generation was a five-door version of the Alto Works. With the December 2000 facelift, the Works versions were discontinued, as the Alto was realigned as an economy version. The Suzuki Kei Sports picked up the Works' mantle.

Several derivatives were produced from this generation. Suzuki produced two "classic-style" versions: the Alto C with a deep chrome grille and a curious headlamp arrangement by which circular main lamps were joined with ovoid sidelights and indicators, which was shared with the Alto Works; and the later Alto C2 which had separate headlamps and sidelights and a wider grille. Mazda also sold the standard Alto as the Carol, and Mitsuoka used the Carol as a basis for their Ray.

Facelift
In December 2000, the fifth generation Alto received a thorough facelift, becoming the HA23. Front- and four-wheel drive models now used the same chassis number. The K6A met the MLIT requirements to be classified as an "excellent low emissions vehicle". The retro-style Alto C was also discontinued. In February 2001 a new retro version was introduced, the Alto C2. Unlike the earlier C, this one had the same headlights as other Altos and did not have the chrome detailing of the earlier version.

Front- or four-wheel-drive, manual and automatic transmissions were available (no more CVT), in either a 3- or 5-door hatchback body. A 3-door van version remained available. Passenger model production was discontinued in August 2004 to make room for the succeeding generation, but a decontented Van version was kept in production until January 2005. These forwent the VVT system and the automatic only had three forward speeds rather than four as before.

In other markets
This model also entered production in India as the Maruti Suzuki Alto (model code RF) in September 2000 and was built there until 2014. From 2002 until 2009 Maruti-built Altos were exported to Europe as Suzuki Altos; sales continued in Latin America and other markets until the next generation Maruti Alto took over in 2012. The car is powered with 0.8-litre F8D three-cylinder and 1.1-litre F10D four-cylinder engines with fuel injection.

Pakistani production began in 2000 utilizing the old carburetted 1.0-litre F10A four-cylinder engine and also available with CNG variant. The production was halted in 2012.

Beginning in mid-1999, and originally imported from Japan, the car was also sold in Colombia as the Chevrolet Alto. As the market for two-door cars was minimal in Colombia, it was only available with five doors. GM Colmotores began building it themselves in 2000 and kept it in production until 2003. The Chevrolet Alto was also exported to Ecuador.

Sixth generation (2004)

The sixth-generation Alto (HA24) was introduced in September 2004. The bonnet and headlamps curved down at the front, giving a similar effect to the Toyota WiLL Vi or the Citroën C2. The Alto was realigned as a less costly car to accommodate new models such as the Cervo and Alto Lapin. The more powerful engines were moved into the other more upmarket versions like the Suzuki Kei Works and Alto Lapin SS, leaving the Alto with only a  version. In Japan, this version of the Alto was not only rebadged as the Mazda Carol, but also by Nissan as the Pino.

The RPM meter maxes out at 10,000 rather than 8,000, as usual for gasoline vehicles.

Seventh generation (2009)

Japan

The seventh-generation Alto was first shown at the 2009 Tokyo Motor Show alongside its sister car, the Mazda Carol. It is available with a  engine, a 5-speed manual, a 4-speed automatic transmission or a CVT, in FWD or 4WD variants. Under the Japanese 10-15 test cycle, the front-wheel-drive with CVT achieves 24.5 km/litre fuel economy.

In 2011, Suzuki launched the Alto Eco variant, that features the R06A engine lifted from the Suzuki MR Wagon and an idling stop function. It is capable of reaching  based on Japan's JC08 Mode test cycle (32 km/L under 10-15 test cycle). This is .2 km/L higher than the Daihatsu Mira e:S.

In 2013, the Alto Eco was updated with the addition of Suzuki's ENE-CHARGE system, first applied on the fifth generation Wagon R. With this technology, fuel economy has now improved to 33.0 km/L based on Japan's JC08 Mode test cycle.

International

The Suzuki Alto available in international market is known in India as the Maruti Suzuki A-Star (short for "Alto-Star"), but is also known as the Suzuki Celerio in some other countries. It was launched in December 2008 by Suzuki's Indian subsidiary Maruti Suzuki.

It is actually a different car from the Japanese market one although they share the same name. The car is manufactured exclusively in Haryana, India and is exported worldwide. It is available in some European markets with a somewhat different front end as the Nissan Pixo. The car was rolled out to the Indian customers in December 2008 and exports began in April 2009.

With a totally new body and engine, Maruti hopes to bring freshness to the Indian car market, of which it already holds a major share. The  K10B inline-three engine was developed especially for the new car, and is also used for the Nissan Pixo. The A-Star has a fresh new dashboard, with an available unique protruding tachometer besides the usual meter cowl (only in the ZXi trim).

In February 2014, Maruti Suzuki unveiled an all-new Celerio, which replaces the A-Star and Zen Estilo.

The European market version of the Maruti Suzuki A-Star was unveiled at the 2008 Paris Motor Show. It was developed to be a global car and will be made at Maruti Suzuki's plant in Manesar, Haryana, India. It is stylistically based on the Suzuki A-Star Concept. The Alto was conceived as a response to high petrol prices and global warming. It was released as an eco-friendly car priced from £6,795 OTR.

Nissan Pixo
The Nissan Pixo is the "sister car" to the Suzuki Alto and is mechanically very similar, but featuring a few notable exterior differences, including the main grille and headlamps. It was launched at the 2008 Paris Motor Show and was available in Europe from 2009 to 2013. Because it was developed and built cheaply in India, the Pixo was sold for just under £7,000. In the summer of 2013, the Pixo was withdrawn from UK showrooms.

The Nissan Pixo was reviewed, and subsequently mocked, by Top Gear in series 17.  The review became a Top Gear challenge where Jeremy Clarkson and Richard Hammond bought cars on the second hand market for the same price as a new Pixo.  Clarkson bought a 2002 Mercedes Mercedes CL600 for £6995, and Hammond bought a 1994 BMW 850ci for £6,700.  James May defended the Pixo, arguing that it was more modern, reliable and economical than the two luxury cars.

Suzuki Alto 800

In 2012, India's Maruti introduced a low cost replacement for the original Maruti 800 called the Alto 800. This was also exported to many markets outside of Europe and sold as the Suzuki Alto 800, while some markets simultaneously offered the pricier A-Star as the Suzuki Alto.

Eighth generation (2014)

The eighth-generation Alto was introduced in Japan in December 2014. The new Alto was the first Suzuki's car designed on lightweight HEARTECT platform. It is also the first Alto that using torsion beam model rear suspension, replacing the old 3-link model (except for all-wheel-drive models). The new lightweight platform, lighter body, engine, seats and simpler rear suspension made the car  lighter than the outgoing model.

The conventional models of the new Alto is available in 5 trim levels. The passenger variant are called "F", "L", "S" and "X", plus a commercial van variant called "VP". All powered with a naturally-aspirated K06A  inline-three engine, from previous generation. This engine received major improvement in fuel efficiency by raising the compression ratio and adopting the exhaust gas recirculation (EGR) system (excludes "F" trim with manual transmission and "VP" van), while enhancing the low-to-mid speed driving performance by newly designing the intake and exhaust systems. The weight also reduced by adopting a cylinder head integrated with an exhaust manifold and simplifying the catalyzer case. It is mated with either a 5-speed manual transmission ("F" and "VP"), a 5-speed automated manual transmission called Auto Gear Shift (AGS) by Suzuki ("F" and "VP"), or a CVT ("L", "S" and "X"). All transmissions are available with all wheel-drive option.

A sporty variant intended for daily use called "Turbo RS" was introduced in March 2015 which was followed by a more spartan performance-tuned "Works" variant which made a comeback after 15 years of absence in December. These high performance models are powered with the turbocharged variant of K06A engine, producing  and  - ("Works" is  higher). It is paired with either a 5-speed manual (not available for "Turbo RS") or automated manual transmission with taller gear ratios than the less powerful "F" and VP" trims. The handling is also reworked with new wider high performance tires from Bridgestone, shock absorber from KYB, ventilated front disc brakes, strut bar to increase body's rigidity, rear stabilizer bar for front wheel-drive models (also available for "X" trim).

For the interior, unlike the previous generation, adjustable front seats head rest and 50:50 foldable back seats (still with adjustable head rest, excluding "VP", "F" and "L" trims) are deleted. All natural aspirated engined models received two tone black and white colours. 
In 2018, the seat upholstery was replaced with dark blue colour for "L", "S" and "X" trims. "Turbo RS" and "Works" trims has black with red accents interior colour, leather wrapped steering wheel, paddle shift for AGS models and tachometer. The "Works" trim added racing front seats from Recaro, stainless steel pedals and turbo boost meter.

In term of exterior, all naturally aspirated models are using halogen headlights as standard and 13 inches steel wheels with hubcaps (except "VP") and "X" with special two tone colours. The "Turbo RS" and "Works" received more sporty bumpers, side skirts, rear upper spoiler, fog lights, stickers, 15 inches aluminium wheels from Enkei (also available for "X" trim), front brake calipers with red colour for "Works" and HID headlights.

The safety is also upgraded with additional electronic stability control and collision avoidance system. The car achieved 4 of 5 stars in crash tests performed by JNCAP.

To celebrate 40 years anniversary of Alto, a special edition called "L Limited" was launched in June 2019. The car is based on "L" trim with additional accessories and features from higher trims.

The "Turbo RS" trim was discontinued in December 2018, followed by "X" trim in October 2020, "VP" commercial van in August 2021 and finally replaced by ninth generation four months later.

Pakistan 
The eighth-generation Alto was revealed for the Pakistani market on 12 April 2019 at the Pakistan Auto Show (PAPS). The car is sold in three variants: "VX", "VXR" and "VXL". The "VX" being the base model with minimal equipment, no air conditioning and a 5-speed manual transmission; the "VXR" variant gaining twin airbags, power locks, power steering, etc.; while the premium "VXL" model is further equipped with air conditioning, ABS brakes, and an automated manual transmission "AGS".

The local manufacturing of Alto has made Pakistan one of the few countries in the world that locally manufactures kei cars. Currently, Pakistan is the only country other than Japan to locally manufacture this generation of Suzuki Alto. Pak Suzuki Motors' second generation Alto looks cosmetically the same as the Japanese-made one and is powered by the same engine.

Ninth generation (2021)

The ninth-generation Alto was introduced in Japan in December 2021. It is continued to be built on lightweight HEARTECT platform and powered with the same R06A engine for the conventional models. Additionally, the car received new R06D engine with mild hybrid system that was also seen in Suzuki Wagon R Smile. CVT is the only transmission that available in this generation and became the first Alto without manual transmission option. The Auto Gear Shift (AGS) automated manual transmission is also abolished.

Four trim levels are available, "A" and "L" for conventional model and "S" and "X" for hybrid model.

References

External links

  

Alto
Cars introduced in 1979
1980s cars
1990s cars
2000s cars
2010s cars
2020s cars
Kei cars
City cars
Hatchbacks
Vans
Front-wheel-drive vehicles
All-wheel-drive vehicles
Vehicles with CVT transmission